New Formalism is an architectural style that emerged in the United States during the mid-1950s and flowered in the 1960s. Buildings designed in that style exhibited many Classical elements including "strict symmetrical elevations" building proportion and scale, Classical columns, highly stylized entablatures and colonnades. The style was used primarily for high-profile cultural, high tech, institutional and civic buildings. Edward Durrell Stone's New Delhi American Embassy (1954), which blended the architecture of the east with modern western concepts, is considered to be the symbolic start of New Formalism architecture.

Common features of the New Formalism style include:
 Use of traditionally rich materials such as travertine, marble, and granite or man-made materials that mimic their luxurious qualities
 Buildings usually set on a podium
 Designed to achieve modern monumentality
 Embraces classical precedents, such as arches, colonnades, classical columns and entablatures
 Smooth wall surfaces
 Delicacy of details
 Formal landscape; use of pools, fountains, and a sculpture within a central plaza

Notable architects
 Welton Becket
 Philip Johnson
 Edward Durell Stone
 Minoru Yamasaki

Notable examples

 McGregor Memorial Conference Center, Detroit, Michigan (1958)
 Pacific Science Center, Seattle, Washington (1962)
 Lincoln Center for the Performing Arts, New York City (1962/69)
 Memphis International Airport, Memphis, Tennessee (1963)
 Uptown Campus, University at Albany, SUNY, Albany, New York (1964)
 2 Columbus Circle, New York City (1964)
 Dorothy Chandler Pavilion, Los Angeles, California (1964)
 Cambridge Tower, Austin, Texas (1965)
 Old World Trade Center, Lower Manhattan, New York (1966)
 Ahmanson Theater, Los Angeles, California (1967)
 United States Confluence Theater - now John H. Wood Federal Courthouse, San Antonio, Texas (1968)
 The Forum, Inglewood, California (1967)
 Wilshire Colonnade, Los Angeles, California (1970)
 John F. Kennedy Center for the Performing Arts, Washington, D.C. (1971)
 Teacher Retirement System of Texas Headquarters, Austin, Texas (1973)
 Istiqlal Mosque, Jakarta, Indonesia (1978)
 Weber County Main Library, Ogden, Utah (1968)

References

 
20th-century architectural styles
Architectural styles
American architectural styles

Architectural history